The Tranzit Group is a company that operates buses in New Zealand. It was founded by Albert Snelgrove as Grey Bus Service in 1924. It became Blue Bus Service (with a livery change) in the early 1950s and then Tranzit Coachlines in 1985. It has a 46% shareholding in InterCity.

Urban services

Tranzit operates urban services in Auckland, New Plymouth, Whanganui, Palmerston North, Wairarapa, Wellington and Hutt Valley. In 2018 under the brand name Tranzurban, it began operating 60 percent of the Metlink bus network under contract to Greater Wellington Regional Council. This includes delivering urban services in Wairarapa, Hutt Valley and Wellington city. Tranzurban purchased 225 Euro 6 diesel buses, which meet the highest global emission standards, and 10 EVDDs, the first in the Southern Hemisphere. This fleet has been running successfully since, with innovations made to the EVDDs. The fleet will incrementally grow to 41 by Sept 2022 after Tranzurban confirmed in June 2020 it will incrementally add 31 more new EVDDs. This will help Wellington achieve its target of carbon neutrality by 2030. In 2021, Tranzit converted a diesel double decker to electric in Masterton.

As part of a reorganisation of Auckland's northern bus network on the North Shore, "Tranzurban Auckland" became the contracted operator of the newly designated NX2 services (formerly the 881 route) on the Northern Busway from 30 September 2018.

Fleet
As of July 2020, Tranzit Group operates more than 1800 vehicles nationwide, including 11 electric buses. These vehicles represent some of New Zealand's most well known travel and transport brands owned by Tranzit Group including: Cross Country Rentals, Tranzit Coachlines, Tranzit Tours, Pacific Tourways Limited, Tranzurban Wellington, Hutt Valley & Auckland, Hammonds Wellington Tours, Rite Price Rentals and Maugers Rentals. Tranzit Group is also part owner of Intercity. For the Wellington contract, 114 Optare MetroCitys will be purchased.

In Wellington, the company operates ten electric double decker buses on urban routes. An additional 31 double deck electric buses are expected to be in service by 2022.

References

Bus companies of New Zealand
Transport companies established in 1924
New Zealand companies established in 1924